Dioryctria mutuurai is a species of snout moth in the genus Dioryctria. It was described by Herbert H. Neunzig in 2003 and is known from the US state of California.

References

Moths described in 2003
Endemic fauna of California
mutuurai
Fauna without expected TNC conservation status